The Amoa River is a river of northeastern New Caledonia. It forms a prominent valley. It has a catchment area of 182 square kilometres.

See also
List of rivers of New Caledonia
Geography of New Caledonia

References

Rivers of New Caledonia